Saint is a manhua by Hong Kong comics artist Khoo Fuk Lung. It follows the life and adventures of Sun Wukong, the monkey king from the 16th century novel Journey to the West. It was first published by Jade Dynasty and is licensed by Yuk Long Limited.

Summary 
A stone monkey is born from the divine rock as a child of the Heaven and Earth. Di Shi Tian, the Jade Emperor who presides over Heaven, orders thunder deity Lei Gong to inflict Heavenly Punishment on the monkey, but Lei Gong is unable to do so. The monkey studies the 73 transformations from Puti Laozu the Master of the Sun, and is given the name Sun Wukong. Lei Gong attempts to eliminate him again with Heavenly Punishment, but Sun uses his abilities to protect his master and his fellow students.

Sun receives the title of Bumayun (horsekeeper) from Di Shi Tian, and finds the position to be lowly. He fights with some deities, including Tianpeng Yuanshai.  He rescues 108 demons from Pangu's temple. Dashan Ru Lai captures Sun and imprisons him in Mount Wu Xing. Di Shi Tian punishes Sanyan Zhanshen and Beidou-Xingjun for their carelessness.

A strange old man provokes Xuanzang. Erlang, the reincarnation of Sanyan Zhanshen, commits many crimes by killing demons, and gets Taizong, the Tang Dynasty Emperor, and his servants involved. Yuchi Gong dies. Xuanzang uses a divine rod to eliminate the demons attacking the emperor. Taizong gives Xuanzang the title of Saintly Monk.

Xuanzang recruits Sun Wukong, Zhu Bajie, Sha Wujing and Xiao Bailong to his group and goes on the mission to retrieve the Sanzangjing ("Three Collections of (Buddhist) Scriptures") from the West. On the way they fight Jinjiao (gold horn) and Yinjiao (Silver Horn).  They defeat Jinjiao, kill the Scorpion King, and Hei Nuhou (Black Queen). They become friends with Jinjiao and Tianxun Niang. They challenge Baoluwang. Sun and Baoluwang become sworn brothers. Sun then helps Baoluwang and Feng Hou fight against the Heavenly Punishment. Erlang combines Jimo Yuansu (極魔元素, ultimate demon element) with Baoluwang's son, and transforms him into a jimo.

Characters

Sun Wukong
Sun Wukong is a child of the Heaven and the Earth, born from a divine rock. In the early chapters, Di Shi Tian orders the thunder deity Lei Gong to eliminate him, but Lei Gong is unable to. In his youth, Sun leads the monkeys and monsters in the Mountain of Flowers and Fruit and sets camp in Shuilian Cave. After an old monkey dies, Sun travels to the fairy island to learn skills and magic from grandmaster Pútí, including 73 transformations. Because he gives Puti trouble, he leaves his master and instigates a rebellion against Heaven. While fighting Sanyan Zhanshen, he rescues 108 demons, which angers Di Shi Tian and which provokes Dashan Ru Lai. As a result, he is imprisoned inside Mount Wu Xing. He steals Pangu's Ruyi Jingu Bang staff and eats the empress Tianmu Niangniang's "Peaches of Immortality". He is based on Sun Wukong from the Journey to the West stories.

Xuanzang's group
Xuanzang (玄奘) is the title character of Saint. He is a Buddhist monk who was reincarnated from Jinchanzi, a disciple of Ru Lai. He assembles and leads a group of characters to recover the Sānzàngjīng, the "Three Collections of (Buddhist) Scriptures".

Xuanzang's group includes the following characters:
  (雲雨, lit. "Cloud and rain"), a pretty demoness that Sun Wukong rescues from Lei Yin Temple. She makes friends with Sun, and when he is confined in Mount Wu Xing, she follows Ru Lai's orders to find Sun's heart and return it to him.  When she and Sun fight Bingpo Daxian, she is destroyed to ice dust. Xiaoshan Guanyin promises to revive her.
 Xiaobao (小寶), an insect demon, is a friend of Sun from his first day with his Grandmaster.
 Shawang (沙王, lit. "Sand king"), a demon who was Sha Wujing and Xiao Bailong's master. Although he is forced to help Sun Wukong three times, he later becomes Sun's friend.
  (豬八戒 or Zhu Daxian 豬大仙), formerly known as Tianpeng Yuanshuai (天蓬元帅), an exiled deity. He is based on Zhu Bajie. He has a fiancée named Gao Ruolan (高弱蘭), whose name is loosely similar to her Journey to the West counterpart Gao Cuilan (高翠蘭).
  (沙悟凈 or Sha Baonan 沙暴男), a former servant of the sand king. He is based on Sha Wujing.
  (小白龍), the prince of the East Sea, and the son of sea king Jiao Ye. He is based on the Bailongma.

Heaven
The Heaven world is ruled by Di Shi Tian. Major characters include:
  (帝釋天), based on the Chinese supreme god (e.g. Jade Emperor, Shangdi, Tian) and the Buddhist deity Śakra (Indra). The manhua refers to him as the Heavenly Sovereign of the heaven (天堂). Di Shi Tian has a master who taught him martial arts, his name is Heavenly Sovereign of True Martial Arts (真武天皇 Zhenwu Tianhuang).
  (天母娘娘 Lady Mother of Heaven), Di Shi Tian's wife. She is based on Xi Wangmu.
  (二郎 Second-born Son), a wargod with three eyes. He assumes several different names in the series, from Sanyan Zhanshen (三眼戰神) to Erlang Shen (二郎神) to Sanyan Moshen (三眼魔神) when he joins Wansui Yaodi's demon world. He is based on the deity Erlang Shen. He has a hound named Heavenly Dog (哮天犬 Xiaotian Quan).

Other characters include:
 Yuanshi Tianzun (元始天尊), based on character of the same name.
 Zheng Tianwang  (正天王),  based on Li Jing. His son is Xie (邪), who is based on Nezha, son of Li Jing.
 Jiao E, the sea king (海王 蛟悪), the dragon king.
 Bai Juweng (百足翁)
 Weituo (韋馱), based on Weituo (Skanda).
 Zhu Rong (祝融), a firegod based on the deity with the same name.
 Bingpo Daxian (氷珀大仙), a blizzard god who indirectly destroys Yunyu. He follows Di Shi Tian's order to inflict Heavenly Punishment on the son of Baoluwang and Feng Hou. His name is based on the Taoist immortals.

Four Weather Gods
The Four Weather Gods are:
 Feng Bo (风伯), the wind deity. He takes over after Feng Hou leaves. He is portrayed as not smart but loves fighting. He is based on Feng Bo.
 Yu Shi (雨师), the rain deity. He has loved Feng Hou for a long time but she does not feel the same, and thus hates Baoluwang for taking her. He is based on Yu Shi.
 Lei Gong (雷公), the thunder deity. He is ordered by Heaven to destroy Sun Wukong after his birth, but he is unable to do so, and retreats with the reason "Heaven doesn't want him dead, so he's alive". He later joins the Heavenly Punishment to punish Baoluwang, but he does not fight a lot because of his old friendship with Feng Hou. He is based on Lei Gong.
 Dian Mu (電母), the lightning deity. She is Lei Gong's wife and joins in the Heavenly Punishment against Baoluwang, but like Lei Gong, she does not fight a lot because of her friendship with Feng Hou. She is based on Dian Mu.

Four Gatekeeper-Gods 
The Four Gatekeeper-Gods (四大門神 Si Da Men Shen) are the guardians of Heaven. They are based on the Four Heavenly Kings who assist Jiang Ziya in The Investiture of the Gods.
 East Gatekeeper-God (東方門神) uses a pipa as a weapon. He was killed in Sun's rebellion. He is based on Dhṛtarāṣṭra.
 West Gatekeeper-God (西方門神) uses a great serpent as a weapon. He was killed in Sun's rebellion. He is based on Virūpākṣa.
 North Gatekeeper-God (北方門神) uses an umbrella as a weapon. He is alive after Sun's rebellion. He later gets orders from Di Shi Tian to assist Xuanzang's group to defeat Xuemo. He is based on Vaiśravaṇa.
 South Gatekeeper-God (南方門神) uses a sword as a weapon. He was killed in Sun's rebellion. He is based on Virūḍhaka.

Four Guardians
The Four Guardians (四灳神將 Si Ling Zhanxiang) also come from Chinese mythology under the name Four Symbols. They also have directional titles. They consist of:
 Qing Long  (青龙), the guardian of the East, based on the same character.
 Bai Hu (白虎), the guardian of the West, based on the same character.
 Xuan Wu (玄武), the guardian of the North. He is a little monk who as his reincarnation "Enanni" (婀难妮) prevents Sun Wukong destroying Ru Lai's statue. He is based on the same character.
 Zhu Que (朱雀), the guardian of the South, based on the same character. She is a goddess whose reincarnation is a crimson firebird who has helped Yaowang.

The guardian of time is Long Shen (龙神). He moves Sun Wukong to the year 2004, and three demons to the year 2003, where they create many crimes. The author uses those monsters to describe the reason of the outbreak of SARS. He is based on the dragon guardian Huang Long, who is the leader of Ssu Ling Gods.

Realm of the Dead
The Realm of the Dead, or Hells (地獄 Diyu) led by King Yanluo (閻羅王), who is based on Yama in Chinese mythology, and is in charge of Ox-Head and Horse-Face, Black and White Impermanence.  One of the demon hunters in the Realm is Zhong Kui (鍾馗) who was formerly a vanquisher of ghosts and evil beings in the human world, based on the character of the same name.

Buddhists
The Buddhists are part of the Lei Yin Temple. They are led by master , who defeats Sun Wukong after he causes a rebellion against Tianjie. He arranges for Sun Wukong to assist his disciple Xuanzang to get the Three Collections of Scriptures (三藏經 Sānzàngjīng, Tripiṭaka). Da Shan Ru Lai (大善如来) is based on Siddhārtha Gautama, the chief Tathāgata. Other Buddhists involved in the series include Xiao Shan Guan Yin (小善觀音), a nun who helps Xuanzang's group many times and has attracted Sun Wukong's interest. She is based on Guan Yin or Avalokiteśvara. Also serving the Lei Yin Temple are the Eighteen Arhats.

Tang Dynasty
The manhua features the following rulers and government officials from the Tang Dynasty:
 Wei Zheng, the empire minister. He is based on Wei Zheng, a hero from the historical novel Shuo Tang.
 Yuchi Gong, one of the founding generals. In Saint, he is eaten by the demons that attack Taizong.
 Qin Shubao, one of the founding generals.
 Li Chunfeng, the empire strategist.

Taoists
The Taoists are led by grandmaster Puti Zhushi (菩提老祖). Puti is based on Subhuti, Wukong's first master in Journey to the West. He teaches Sun Wukong 73 transformations. Because of Sun's rebellion, he is banned from becoming a deity. Puti Laozu has several disciples, including: Puti Zi (菩提子), a girl who travels to defeat 108 evil spirits; Ya Ya (啞啞), the elder pupil who is the same generation as Sun and fights Jian Weishi to protect Yun Yu; and Sun Chimao (孫翅毛), known as the Godly Doctor.

Demons

72 Caverns
The stories with the 72 caverns feature the following kings:
 Xiong Shiwang (兇獅王, lit. "Ferocious lion king"), also known as Jinshan Dongzhu (金山洞主, lit. Chief of "Golden Mountain" Cavern)
 Xiong Luwang (熊力王, lit. "Bear king of power"), also known as Yinpan Dongzhu (銀磐洞主, lit. Chief of "Silver Stone" Cavern)
 Yishu Longwang (異首龍王, lit. "Strange-headed dragon king"), also known as Lingshe Dongzhu (龗蛇洞主, lit. Chief of "Miraculous Snakes" Cavern)

Huoyan Zu
The Huoyan Zu (火宴族) family consists of:
 Baoluwang (暴力王, lit. Ferocious King), the Ox-Demon-King, based on the character Niúmówáng.
  (铁娘子, lit. Iron lady), the wife of Baoluwang. She used to be Feng Hou (风后), the wind deity, but falls in love with Baoluwang and leaves Heaven. She is based on the character Princess Iron Fan.
 Huo Hai'er (火孩兒, lit. Fire Child), the son of Baoluwang and Tie niangzi. He is based on the character Red Boy.

Demon Realm
 (萬歲妖帝, lit. Ten-Thousand Year Old Demon King) is the lord of the Demon Realm. Sanyan Zhanshen joins Mojie and calls himself Sanyan Moshen. There are also the following characters:
 Baimo Shi (白魔使), the Demon Lord's messenger. He is based on Baigujing. Baimo's black half is called Heimo Shi (黑魔使), and together they form Yin-Yang Mowang (陰陽魔王).
 Xiongling Wang (兇龗王) is a spirit cat who absorbs the evil spirits of the heroes from the past, and gets them to fight for him. He has nine souls and can control up to nine spirits. He first captures Lü Bu (呂布), a hero from the Three Kingdoms period. The second spirit he claims is Xiang Yu (項羽), a hero from the Qin period. The third spirit he captures is Zhang Jiao (張角), a leader of the Yellow Turban Rebellion in the Eastern Han period.  He absorbs Bai Di (白帝, lit. White Emperor, who may be based on Gongsun Shu), the mythological son of the sun with a lion face and a human body. When he absorbs Puti Laozu, he discovers he cannot absorb any more and is forced to return Laozu's spirit to Wukong, although the spirit is destroyed by Lei Gong by accident. Xiongling Wang has a servant named Xuemo (血魔, lit. Blood demon).
 Yaowang (妖王, lit. Demon king) is a powerful demon who challenges the wargod Zhenwu Tianhuang (真武天皇) one hundred times but loses every time. He then challenges Sun Wukong. He is later revealed to be  Wansui Yaodi's younger brother.  He has a servant demon named Jiannu (賤奴, lit. Inferior servant).
 Moxin (魔心, lit. Demon's heart) is a powerful spirit which incarnates from Wukong's evil heart. According to Wansui Yaodi, Maxin has the champion's power which allows him to defeat opponents.

Yiwa Feng
The Yiwa Feng (一窩峰) are a demon tribe led by Sishen-jiangjun. The characters are named after Chinese chess pieces:

 Sishen-jiangjun (死神将軍, lit. Death General, based on the general piece) is a demon who wears a skull mask. He disguises Sun Wukong in order to fool Sanzang. He is based on Six-ear Macaque.
 Jianweishi (士, lit. Sword guard, based on the guard piece) is Zishen Jiangjun's assistant. His lover, Xueji (雪姬, lit. Snow lady), is killed by Yunyu.
 Yanzhi-xiang (燕支象, lit. Rouge elephant, based on the war elephant/minister piece) loves Jianweishi; she stops him from killing Yunyu to avenge the death of Xueqi.

Other characters include Chuanxin-ma (穿心馬, lit. Heart-piercing horse, based on the horse piece), Xuncheng-ju (巡城車, lit. Castle-patrol chariot, based on the chariot piece), Guogong-pao (郭攻砲, lit. Guarding-castle cannon, based on the cannon piece), and the Yaozu soldiers (妖卒, based on the soldier piece).

Dragons
There are five types of Dragons in the series. Tianlong (天龍, Heavenly Dragon) is the lord of the dragons, and the form that Di Shi Tian takes; Bailong (白龍, White Dragon), the female dragons, and the form that Tianmu Niangniang takes; Jiuzhao Jinlong (九爪金龍, Nine-claw Golden Dragon), the dragons of men, and the  incarnations of men's emperors; Nielong (孼龍, Misfortune Dragon), the dragons of the sea that are a later generation of Tianlong; and Molong (魔龍, Demon Dragon), the dragons of evil and the later generation of Nielong.

Reference stories
Saint makes numerous references to Chinese novels and stories including Journey to the West, Romance of the Three Kingdoms, Old Book of Tang, Investiture of the Gods and Book of Han. It includes heroes from those novels such as Lu Bu and his charge Chitu from Romance of the Three Kingdoms; deities from Fengshen Yanyi; Emperor Taizong of Tang and his servants from Old Book of Tang; and Liu Bang and Xiang Yu from Book of Han. The Investiture of the Gods storyline has the Fengshen plan that was made by Di Shi Tian to destroy King Zhou and his demonic army. The revolution was led by Jiang Ziya and Ji Fa with help from the deities. The lost deities' souls were kept in Fengshen Tai.

External links 
 

Comics based on fiction
Fantasy comics
Works based on Journey to the West
Hong Kong comics titles
Shenmo fiction